Takhtajaniantha is a genus of flowering plants in the tribe Cichorieae within the family Asteraceae.

The genus is named for Armenian botanist Armen Takhtajan, 1910-2009.

Species
The only known species is Takhtajaniantha pusilla. It is widespread across central and southwestern Asia (Xinjiang Afghanistan, Kazakhstan, Kyrgyzstan, Mongolia, Pakistan, Tajikistan, Turkmenistan, Uzbekistan, Armenia, Armenia, Nakhichevan, Afghanistan, Iran, Israel, Palestine, Sinai, Saudi Arabia) as well as the Dagestan region of southern European Russia.

References

External links
Montarano Nature Photography, Takhtajaniantha pusilla 
Om Plantae, Takhtajaniantha in Swedish

Monotypic Asteraceae genera
Cichorieae
Flora of Asia
Flora of Russia